The 2007 French Grand Prix (formally the Formula 1 Grand Prix de France 2007) was a Formula One motor race held on 1 July 2007 at the Circuit de Nevers Magny-Cours, Magny-Cours, France. It was the eighth race of the 2007 FIA Formula One World Championship. Kimi Räikkönen for the Ferrari team won the 70-lap race starting from third position. Felipe Massa, who started the race from pole position, finished second in the latter Ferrari, with Lewis Hamilton third in a McLaren car.

Massa controlled most of the race from the front, but Räikkönen overtook him during the second round of pit stops to take the lead.

Report

Background 
Nine teams participated, with the exception of Honda and Super Aguri, who opted to test at the Jerez circuit. Neither Ferrari nor McLaren were fastest on the first two days at Silverstone, rather it was Toyota that was fastest on both of the days. However, on the third and final day of testing Felipe Massa put Ferrari on top with a time of 1:20.805. The nearest challenger, Nico Rosberg was 0.469 behind, with Fernando Alonso a further 0.010 behind. With Ferrari fastest on the third day, both of their drivers, Massa and Kimi Räikkönen were very confident heading into the French round of the season.

Off track Ferrari launched a criminal investigation in Modena against their own employee Nigel Stepney. Stepney's lawyer ruled out sabotage claims, and Stepney said it was part of a "dirty tricks" campaign.

There was also controversy at the rear-end of the grid, as Spyker asked the Fédération Internationale de l'Automobile (FIA) to look at the new updates that were put on the Super Aguri at Indianapolis to see whether the Aguri team are receiving current Honda parts. On Saturday, Super Aguri's managing director Daniel Audetto said "We have rules – they [Spyker] can just protest. Tell them to protest – if I have something to complain about, I will make a protest."

Early on Saturday, Nick Heidfeld was cleared to continue in his BMW after experiencing back pains during Friday practice.

Practice 
Ferrari dominated both practice sessions on the Friday, with Räikkönen fastest in the first Practice Session and Felipe Massa was fastest in the second Practice Session. Behind the Ferraris, Alonso was third in his McLaren, but seven tenths behind, with his teammate and World Championship leader Lewis Hamilton sixth, but lost nearly an hour of the session due to car trouble. The two McLarens were split by David Coulthard and Nico Rosberg.

Hamilton managed to recover from his morning trouble to post the fourth fastest time in the second Practice Session on Friday afternoon. The Ferraris were still leading, but Massa was fastest, just 0.035 seconds ahead of Räikkönen. However, one of the major surprises came from Scuderia Toro Rosso, as Scott Speed posted the third quickest time, with Vitantonio Liuzzi posting the fifth quickest time. During the session, Liuzzi was involved in a bizarre incident with Anthony Davidson; Davidson exited his garage, and smashed his Super Aguri into the side of Liuzzi's Toro Rosso; knocking his front wing off in the accident. Alonso finished the second practice session eighth.

In the final practice session on Saturday morning, Hamilton managed to beat Ferrari, with the Englishman ahead of second-placed Massa by 0.063 seconds. Hamilton and the two Ferraris completed the top three, but Alonso was again down in eighth, having missed nearly the whole of the session with a faulty brake sensor. The Renaults sparked a return to form with Heikki Kovalainen and Giancarlo Fisichella fourth and fifth, both ahead of rivals BMW, who were sixth and fifteenth respectively.

Qualifying 
Both Spykers and both Super Aguris were knocked out of the first phase of qualifying, along with Alexander Wurz's Williams and Vitantonio Liuzzi's Toro Rosso. For Super Aguri's Takuma Sato, it did not matter where he qualified, as he was docked ten places, due to overtaking Jenson Button under yellow flags at the last Grand Prix. Spyker's Adrian Sutil was hoping for a wet race after an unspectacular qualifying. At the front end of the grid, the McLarens were first and fourth, with Hamilton on top, and the Ferraris splitting them in second and third. Heikki Kovalainen rounded out the top five.

David Coulthard failed to complete a single timed lap in the second part of qualifying due to a gearbox problem, and started sixteenth. Both Hondas were knocked out also, along with Mark Webber, Scott Speed and Ralf Schumacher. Both Button and Barrichello were happier with the upgraded Honda, with Button saying "the car is certainly better than the last race in Indianapolis, although the positions don't reflect that". Hamilton was again fastest in Part two, with teammate Alonso down in fifth. Massa, Räikkönen and Kubica rounded out the top four.

After topping the first two parts of qualifying, Hamilton dropped to second in the third and final part, with Massa taking pole position, just 0.070 ahead of the Englishman. Massa stated in the post-Qualifying press conference that "it looks like we [Ferrari] are back and fighting", with Hamilton believing pole was possible had he not made a mistake at Turn 15. Räikkönen qualified third as he lost time on one corner, which he called "all my fault". Alonso was unable to complete a single lap in the session due to a gearbox problem. He was classified tenth and stated that he'd "prefer a wet race". Behind Räikkönen was Kubica in fourth, but despite qualifying fifth, Giancarlo Fisichella believed there was "potential for more" from the Renault. Fisichella's teammate Kovalainen was sixth, with Nick Heidfeld seventh. Jarno Trulli, Nico Rosberg and Alonso rounded out the top ten. Rosberg also had a slight gearbox problem in the final part of qualifying, which he believed cost him a few tenths coming into the final few corners.

Race 

Three people were killed in a helicopter crash at the circuit on Saturday night. They were Emmanuel Longobardi, a PR operative; the pilot Pierre Bennehard; and Simon McGill, a New Zealand national. A Bridgestone employee and his niece were injured. Longobardi was a popular member of the Formula One Paddock.

Adrian Sutil in the Spyker opted to start from the pitlane. Massa got off to the best possible start and retained his lead, but Räikkönen passed Hamilton into Turn One. At the back of the field, Anthony Davidson hit the back of Vitantonio Liuzzi's Toro Rosso. The Toro Rosso came back onto the track and smashed into the side of the Super Aguri. Liuzzi said afterwards that "all we can do is wait for Silverstone and hope that the definite improvement we have made with the car pays off". At the Adelaide hairpin, Jarno Trulli rammed into the back of Heikki Kovalainen. Trulli was out, but Kovalainen continued at the back of the field. Trulli apologised to Kovalainen after the race, and declared it "a racing accident". The tangle promoted Alonso up to eighth.

Robert Kubica was quickly losing ground on the two Ferraris and Hamilton. Alonso passed Rosberg for seventh, and quickly closed in on Heidfeld, but stayed behind him until he pitted on Lap 16. Alonso attempted to get past on Lap five, but ran wide, giving the position back to the German. Hamilton also pitted on Lap 16, with Massa pitting on Lap 19 and Räikkönen on Lap 21.

Räikkönen decreased Massa's lead back down from four seconds to two seconds. Alonso passed both Heidfeld and Fisichella in the middle section of the race. In the second round of stops, Räikkönen pitted two laps after Massa. These two laps extra gave Räikkönen the lead after his second stop, with Massa now second. Alonso pitted for the second time on lap 35. Heidfeld and Fisichella pitted several laps later, and both of them got out in front of Alonso. Christijan Albers had an unusual accident, his car left the pit lane with the fuel rig attached without being detached by the pit crews.  Eventually, he drove to the side of the track and retired.

Räikkönen won the race from teammate Massa, with Hamilton third. This marked Ferrari's first one-two of the season. Massa stated that the race win was lost "because of traffic", while teammate Räikkönen stated he was "much happier with the car", as he became the first Finn to win the race. Kubica was a lonely fourth, with Fisichella, Heidfeld, Alonso and Button rounding out the points. Despite it being Button's first points of 2007, he said that he was "not getting too excited about it". Despite finishing seventh, Alonso was still confident about his title chances, saying that he hoped the "two points are important at the end of the season".

Classification

Qualifying 

Notes
 – Fernando Alonso did not set a time in Q3 due to a gearbox problem.
 – David Coulthard did not set a time in Q2 due to a gearbox problem.
 – Takuma Sato was given a drive-through penalty for passing Button under yellow flags at the  but retired from the race before he could serve the penalty, so the penalty was changed to a ten-place grid penalty at this event.

Race

Championship standings after the race 

Drivers' Championship standings

Constructors' Championship standings

Note: Only the top five positions are included for both sets of standings.

See also 
 2007 Magny-Cours GP2 Series round

References

External links

 Official website
 Official Formula1.com page
 Detailed French Grand Prix results

French Grand Prix
French Grand Prix
Grand Prix
French Grand Prix